Julius Philip Jacob Adriaan, Count van Zuylen van Nijevelt (19 August 1819 – 1 July 1894) was a conservative Dutch politician.

From 1855 till 1860 he served as Minister Resident in Istanbul, during which time he offered The Union Church of Istanbul to use the Dutch Chapel.

Van Zuylen van Nijevelt served as Prime Minister of the Netherlands (chairman of the Council of Ministers) from 1866 to 1868. He also served as minister of Foreign Affairs from 1860 to 1861, and again from 1866 tot 1868.

He married in Scotland and had three sons and two daughters.

A member of the prominent Rotterdam patrician (regenten) family of Van Zuylen van Nijevelt, he was a son of Pieter Hendrik van Zuylen van Nijevelt, a Dutch general who was present at the Battle of Waterloo, among others.

Honours 
 1849: Officer in the Order of Leopold.

See also
List of Dutch politicians

References

 

1819 births
1894 deaths
Prime Ministers of the Netherlands
Ministers of Foreign Affairs of the Netherlands
Independent politicians in the Netherlands
19th-century Dutch diplomats
Dutch members of the Dutch Reformed Church
People from Luxembourg City
Counts Van Zuylen van Nijevelt